Willard B. Place House is a historic home located at Logansport, Cass County, Indiana. It was built about 1889, and is a -story, Queen Anne style brick dwelling.  It has a hipped roof with multiple cross gables, a conical roofed corner turret, and one-story wraparound porch.  Also on the property are an attached garage (c. 1920), carriage house (c. 1889), and brick wall.

It was listed on the National Register of Historic Places in 1998.

References

Houses on the National Register of Historic Places in Indiana
Queen Anne architecture in Indiana
Houses completed in 1889
Houses in Cass County, Indiana
National Register of Historic Places in Cass County, Indiana
Logansport, Indiana